Full Moon in Paris is a 1984 French romantic comedy-drama film written and directed by Éric Rohmer. The film stars Pascale Ogier, Tchéky Karyo and Fabrice Luchini. The score is by Elli et Jacno.

Full Moon in Paris was the fourth instalment in Rohmer's Comedies and Proverbs series. The story opens with the proverb "Qui a deux femmes perd son âme, qui a deux maisons perd la raison" ("He who has two women loses his soul. He who has two houses loses his mind.")

Synopsis

Trainee textile designer Louise (Pascale Ogier) lives in Marne-la-Vallée, a suburb some 20 miles from central Paris, with her architect lover Rémi (Tchéky Karyo), but also has a small flat as a pied-à-terre in the centre of the city. Feeling confined by their relationship she tells Remi she intends spending more evenings in the flat in solitude, while able to go to parties, which he doesn't like - when her friend Camille (Virginie Thévenet) holds one, he turns up late, doesn't enjoy himself and leaves early, upsetting Louise. After she's redecorated the flat and moved in, she's surprised to see Rémi in a Paris cafe. Her gossipy journalist friend Octave (Fabrice Luchini) says he thought he saw Camille there at the same time: Louise is jealous at the thought that they might have got together, though it turns out Camille was in Milan at the time. Octave, who's married, later declares his love for Louise, partly because he's jealous she plans to spend the evening with a sax player, Bastien (Christian Vadim). She says she only wants Octave as a friend. However, after sleeping with Bastien in the flat, she immediately feels constricted there too, and goes out in the middle of the night to a bar. There, an illustrator (László Szabó) explains that it's because of the full moon: it unsettles everyone's emotions. She realises she really wants to be with Rémi and rushes back to Marne next morning - but when he appears, he tells her he's fallen in love, not with Camille but with her flatmate Marianne (Anne-Séverine Liotard), and plans to spend his life with her. Louise, shocked that he's taken her at her word when she claimed she was happy with an open relationship, packs and miserably moves out of the house.

References

External links
 
 
 
 Les Nuits de la pleine lune at filmsdefrance.com

1984 films
1984 comedy-drama films
1984 romantic comedy films
1984 romantic drama films
1980s French-language films
1980s romantic comedy-drama films
Films directed by Éric Rohmer
Films produced by Margaret Ménégoz
Films shot in Paris
French romantic comedy-drama films
1980s French films